The Thirtieth of September Movement (abbreviated as G30S, also known by the acronym Gestapu for Gerakan September Tiga Puluh, Thirtieth of September Movement) was a self-proclaimed organization of Indonesian National Armed Forces members who, in the early hours of 1 October 1965, assassinated six Indonesian Army generals in an abortive coup d'état, resulting in the unofficial but more accurate name of Gestok, for Gerakan Satu Oktober, or First of October Movement. Later that morning, the organisation declared that it was in control of media and communication outlets and had taken President Sukarno under its protection. By the end of the day, the coup attempt had failed in Jakarta. Meanwhile, in central Java there was an attempt to take control over an army division and several cities. By the time this rebellion was put down, two more senior officers were dead.

In the days and weeks that followed, the army, socio-political, and religious groups blamed the coup attempt on the Communist Party of Indonesia (PKI). Soon a mass purge was underway, which resulted in the imprisonment and deaths of actual or suspected Communist Party members and sympathizers. Under the New Order, the movement was usually referred to as "G30S/PKI" by those wanting to associate it with the PKI, and this term is also sometimes used by the current government.

Investigations and questioning of Suharto's version of the events were long obstructed in Indonesia. While the CIA initially believed that Sukarno orchestrated all of it, several outside sources found inconsistencies and holes in the army claims, notably Benedict Anderson and Ruth McVey who wrote the Cornell Paper that challenged it.

Background 
From the late 1950s, President Sukarno's position came to depend on balancing the opposing and increasingly hostile forces of the army and the PKI. His "anti-imperialist" ideology made Indonesia increasingly dependent on the Soviet Union and, particularly, China. By 1965, at the height of the Cold War, the PKI extensively penetrated all levels of government. With the support of Sukarno and the air force, the party gained increasing influence at the expense of the army, thus ensuring the army's enmity. By late 1965, the army was divided between a left-wing faction allied with the PKI and a right-wing faction that was being courted by the United States.

In need of Indonesian allies in its Cold War against the Soviet Union, the United States cultivated a number of ties with officers of the military through exchanges and arms deals. This fostered a split in the military's ranks, with the United States and others backing a right-wing faction against a left-wing faction leaning towards the PKI.

When Sukarno rejected food aid from USAID, thereby exacerbating famine conditions, the right-wing military adopted a regional command structure through which it could smuggle staple commodities to win the loyalty of the starving rural population. In an attempt to curtail the right-wing military's increasing power, the PKI and the left-wing military formed a number of peasant and other mass organisations.

Insurgency on 30 September

Kidnapping and murder of generals 

At around 3:15 am on 1 October, seven detachments of troops in trucks and buses dispatched by Lieutenant Colonel Untung Syamsuri (commander of Tjakrabirawa, the presidential guard), comprising troops from the Tjakrabirawa Regiment (Presidential Guards), the Diponegoro (Central Java), and Brawijaya (East Java) Divisions, left the movement's base at Halim Perdanakusumah Air Force Base, just south of Jakarta to kidnap seven generals, all members of the Army General Staff. Three of the intended victims, (Minister/Commander of the Army Lieutenant General Ahmad Yani, Major General M. T. Haryono, and Brigadier General D. I. Pandjaitan) were killed at their homes, while three more (Major General Soeprapto, Major General S. Parman, and Brigadier General Sutoyo) were taken alive. Meanwhile, their main target, Coordinating Minister of Defense and Security and Armed Forces Chief of Staff, General Abdul Haris Nasution managed to escape the kidnap attempt by jumping over a wall into the Iraqi embassy garden. However his personal aide, First Lieutenant Pierre Tendean, was captured after being mistaken for Nasution in the dark. Nasution's five-year-old daughter, Ade Irma Suryani Nasution, was shot by the assault group and died on 6 October. In addition a police officer guarding Nasution's neighbour, Police Chief Brigadier Karel Sadsuitubun, was shot and killed by the kidnapping group. A final victim was Albert Naiborhu, General Pandjaitan's nephew, who was killed during the raid on the General's home. The generals and the bodies of their dead colleagues were taken to a place known as Lubang Buaya near Halim where those still alive were shot. The bodies of all the victims were then thrown down a disused well near the base.

Takeover in Jakarta 

Later that morning, around 2,000 troops from two Java-based divisions (the 454th Battalion from the Diponegoro Division and the 530th Battalion from the Brawijaya Division) occupied what is now Lapangan Merdeka, the park around the National Monument in central Jakarta, and three sides of the square, including the RRI (Radio Republik Indonesia) building. They did not occupy the east side of the square – the location of the armed forces strategic reserve (KOSTRAD) headquarters, commanded at the time by Major General Suharto. At some time during the night, D. N. Aidit, the Communist Party of Indonesia (PKI) leader and Air Vice Marshal Omar Dani, the Air Force commander both went to the Halim AFB, which pointed at their involvement in the movement.

Following the news at 7 am, RRI broadcast a message from Lieutenant Colonel Untung Syamsuri, commander of the 1st Honor Guard Battalion (Army), Tjakrabirawa Regiment, to the effect that the 30 September Movement, an internal army organization, had taken control of strategic locations in Jakarta, with the help of other military units. They proclaimed that this was to forestall a coup attempt by a 'Generals' Council' aided by the Central Intelligence Agency, intent on removing Sukarno on Armed Forces Day, 5 October. It was also stated that President Sukarno was under the movement's protection. Sukarno traveled to Halim 'after learning that there were troops near the Palace on the north side of Lapangan Merdeka' and also claimed (later) 'that this was so he could be near an aircraft should he need to leave Jakarta'. Further radio announcements from RRI later that day listed 45 members of the G30S Movement and stated that all army ranks above Lieutenant Colonel would be abolished. While at Halim, the president met with AVM Dani and the other service commanders remaining to plan for a replacement to the post of Commander of the Army which was by now vacant.

The end of the movement in Jakarta 

At 5.30 am, Suharto, commander of the Army's Strategic Reserve (KOSTRAD), was woken up by his neighbor and told of the disappearances of the generals and the shootings at their homes. He went to Kostrad HQ and tried to contact other senior officers. He managed to contact and to ensure the support of the commanders of the Navy and the National Police, but was unable to contact the Air Force Commander. He then took command of the Army and issued orders confining all troops to their barracks.

Because of poor planning, the coup leaders had failed to provide provisions for the troops on Lapangan Merdeka, who were becoming hot and thirsty. They were under the impression that they were guarding the president in the palace. Over the course of the afternoon, Suharto persuaded both battalions to give up without a fight, first the Brawijaya battalion, who came over to Kostrad HQ, then the Diponegoro troops, which withdrew to Halim. His troops gave Untung's forces inside the radio station an ultimatum and they also withdrew. By 7 pm Suharto was in control of all the installations previously held by 30 September Movement's forces. Now joined by Nasution, at 9 pm he announced over the radio that he was now in command of the Army and that he would destroy the counter-revolutionary forces and save Sukarno. He then issued another ultimatum, this time to the troops at Halim. Later that evening, Sukarno left Halim and arrived in Bogor, where there was another presidential palace.

Most of the rebel troops fled, and after a minor battle in the early hours of 2 October, the Army regained control of Halim, Aidit flew to Yogyakarta and Dani to Madiun before the soldiers arrived.

It was only on 4 October when the bodies of all seven casualties were recovered from the well in which they were thrown at Lubang Buaya. They were buried in a state burial on 5 October, Armed Forces Day, preceded by an address by Nasution. All 7 Army officers and the police brigadier were, by order of President Sukarno, officially declared the very same day as Heroes of the Revolution posthumously per Presidential Decision No. 111/KOTI/1965.

Events in Central Java 
Following the 7 am radio broadcast on RRI, troops from the Diponegoro Division in Central Java took control of five of the seven battalions and other units in the name of the 30 September movement. The PKI mayor of Solo, Utomo Ramelan, issued a statement in support of the movement. Rebel troops in Yogyakarta, led by Major Muljono, kidnapped and later killed Col. Katamso and his chief of staff Lt. Col. Sugiyono. However, once news of the movement's failure in Jakarta became known, most of its followers in Central Java gave themselves up. On 5 October, both Katamso and Sugiyono, the commander and executive officer of the 72nd Military Area at the time of their murders, were also posthumously named Heroes of the Revolution.

Aftermath

Anti-communist purge 

Suharto and his associates immediately blamed the PKI as masterminds of the 30 September Movement. With the support of the Army, and fueled by horrific tales of the alleged torture and mutilation of the generals at Lubang Buaya, anti-PKI demonstrations and then violence soon broke out. Violent mass action started in Aceh, then shifted to Central and East Java. Suharto then sent the RPKAD paratroops under Col. Sarwo Edhie to Central Java. When they arrived in Semarang, locals burned the PKI headquarters to the ground. The army swept through the countryside and were aided by locals in killing suspected communists. In East Java, members of Ansor Youth Movement, the youth wing of the Nahdlatul Ulama went on a killing frenzy, and the slaughter later spread to Bali. Figures given for the number of people killed across Indonesia vary from 78,000 to one million. Among the dead was Aidit, who was captured by the Army on 25 November and summarily executed shortly after. Recently released records from the United States Department of State indicate that the U.S. embassy in Jakarta tracked the killings of these leftists, and that U.S. officials "actively supported" the efforts of the Indonesian Army to quell the labor movement.

Several hundred or thousand Indonesian leftists travelling abroad were unable to return to their homeland. Djawoto, the ambassador to China, refused to be recalled and spent the rest of his life outside of Indonesia. Some of these exiles, writers by trade, continued writing. This Indonesian exile literature was full of hatred for the new government and written simply, for general consumption, but necessarily published internationally.

Commemoration 

Immediately following Suharto's appointment as President in 1967, October 1st was decreed as Pancasila Sanctity Day. The government's official narrative is that the day is commemorated to celebrate the triumph of Pancasila over all ideologies, especially "Communism/Marxism-Leninism" (sic; official terminology). It is still commemorated until present day.

Theories about the 30 September Movement

A PKI coup attempt: The first "official" (New Order) version
The Army leadership began making accusations of PKI involvement at an early stage. Later, the government of President Suharto would reinforce this impression by referring to the movement using the abbreviation "G30S/PKI". School textbooks followed the official government line that the PKI, worried about Sukarno's health and concerned about their position should he die, acted to seize power and establish a communist state. The trials of key conspirators were used as evidence to support this view, as was the publication of a cartoon supporting the 30 September Movement in the 2 October issue of the PKI magazine Harian Rakyat (People's Daily). According to later pronouncements by the army, the PKI manipulated gullible left-wing officers such as Untung through a mysterious "special bureau" that reported only to the party secretary, Aidit. This case relied on a confession by the alleged head of the bureau, named Sjam, during a staged trial in 1967. But it was never convincingly proved to Western academic specialists, and has been challenged by some Indonesian accounts.

The New Order government promoted this version with a Rp800 million film directed by Arifin C. Noer entitled Pengkhianatan G30S/PKI (Treachery of G30S/PKI; 1984). Between 1984 and 1998 the film was broadcast on the state television station TVRI and, later, private stations; it was also required viewing at schools and political institutions. A 2000 survey by the Indonesian magazine Tempo found 97% of the 1,101 students surveyed had seen the film; 87% of them had seen it more than once.

A PKI coup attempt: Western scholars' theories 
A number of Western scholars, while rejecting Suharto's propaganda, argue that the 30 September Movement was indeed a PKI coup d'état attempt. John Roosa writes that the 30 May movement was an attempt to purge the Indonesian government of anti-communist influences, that failed because it was "a tangled, incoherent mess". Similarly, Robert Cribb states that "the Movement aimed to throw the army high command off balance, discredit the generals as apparent enemies of Sukarno, and shift Indonesian politics to the left so that the PKI could come to power rapidly, though probably not immediately"; Cribb believes that the PKI acted because it feared that, given Sukarno's failing health, the system of Guided Democracy would soon collapse, allowing the right-wing faction in Indonesian society to take over the country.

Internal army affair
In 1971, Benedict Anderson and Ruth McVey wrote an article which came to be known as the Cornell Paper. In the essay they proposed that the 30 September Movement was not a party-political but entirely an internal army affair, as the PKI had insisted. They claimed that the action was a result of dissatisfaction on the part of junior officers, who found it extremely difficult to obtain promotions and resented the generals' corrupt and decadent lifestyles. They allege that the PKI was deliberately involved by, for example, bringing Aidit to Halim: a diversion from the embarrassing fact the Army was behind the movement.

Recently Anderson expanded on his theory that the coup attempt was almost totally an internal matter of a divided military with the PKI playing only a peripheral role; that the right-wing generals assassinated on 1 October 1965 were, in fact, the Council of Generals coup planning to assassinate Sukarno and install themselves as a military junta. Anderson argues that G30S was indeed a movement of officers loyal to Sukarno who carried out their plan believing it would preserve, not overthrow, Sukarno's rule. The boldest claim in the Anderson theory, however, is that the generals were in fact privy to the G30S assassination plot.

Central to the Anderson theory is an examination of a little-known figure in the Indonesian army, Colonel Abdul Latief. Latief had spent a career in the Army and, according to Anderson, had been both a staunch Sukarno loyalist and a friend with Suharto. Following the coup attempt, however, Latief was jailed and named a conspirator in G30S. At his military trial in the 1970s, Latief made the accusation that Suharto himself had been a co-conspirator in the G30S plot, and had betrayed the group for his own purposes.

Anderson points out that Suharto himself has twice admitted to meeting Latief in a hospital on 30 September 1965 (i.e. G30S) and that his two narratives of the meeting are contradictory. In an interview with American journalist Arnold Brackman, Suharto stated that Latief had been there merely "to check" on him, as his son was receiving care for a burn. In a later interview with Der Spiegel, Suharto stated that Latief had gone to the hospital in an attempt on his life, but had lost his nerve. Anderson believes that in the first account, Suharto was simply being disingenuous; in the second, that he had lied.

Further backing his claim, Anderson cites circumstantial evidence that Suharto was indeed in on the plot. Among these are:
 That almost all the key military participants named as part of G30S were, either at the time of the assassinations or just previously, close subordinates of Suharto: Lieutenant-Colonel Untung, Colonel Latief, and Brigadier-General Supardjo in Jakarta, and Colonel Suherman, Major Usman, and their associates at the Diponegoro Division's HQ in Semarang.
 That in the case of Untung and Latief, their association with Suharto was so close that they attended each other's family events and celebrated their sons' rites of passage together.
 That the two generals who had direct command of all troops in Jakarta (save for the Presidential Guard, who carried out the assassinations) were Suharto and Jakarta Military Territory Commander Umar Wirahadikusumah. Neither of these figures were assassinated, and (if Anderson's theory that Suharto lied about an attempt on his life by Latief) no attempt was even made.
 That during the time period in which the assassination plot was organized, Suharto (as commander of Kostrad) had made a habit of acting in a duplicitous manner: while Suharto was privy to command decisions made in the context of then ongoing Konfrontasie with Malaysia, the intelligence chief of his unit Ali Murtopo had been making connections and providing information to the hostile governments of Malaysia, Singapore, United Kingdom, and the United States through an espionage operation run by Benny Moerdani in Thailand. Moerdani later became a spy chief in Suharto's government.

Suharto with US support
Professor Peter Dale Scott alleges that the entire movement was designed to allow for Suharto's response. Dale Scott draws attention to the fact the side of Lapangan Merdeka on which KOSTRAD was situated was not occupied, and that only those generals who might have prevented Suharto seizing power (except Nasution) were kidnapped. Scott also discusses the relationship between Suharto and three of the Army battalions involved in the coup, which were under his command and staffed by US-trained soldiers. He notes that these battalions switched sides during the rebellion, working to both instigate and quell the coup.

He also alleges that the fact that the generals were killed near an air force base where PKI members had been trained allowed him to shift the blame away from the Army. He links the support given by the CIA to anti-Sukarno rebels in the 1950s to their later support for Suharto and anti-communist forces. He points out that training in the US of Indonesian Army personnel continued even as overt military assistance dried up, and contends that the US contributed substantial covert aid, noting that the US military presence in Jakarta was at an all-time high in 1965, and that the US government delivered a shipment of 200 military aircraft to the Indonesian Army the summer before the coup. Scott also implicates the CIA in the destabilization of the Indonesian economy in 1965, and notes that investment by US corporations in Indonesia increased in the months prior to the movement, which he argues indicates US foreknowledge of the plot.

Another damaging revelation came to light when it emerged that one of the main plotters, Col Latief, was a close associate of Suharto, as were other key figures in the movement, and that Latief actually visited Suharto on the night before the murders.

A Tirto.id article also suggests that Suharto, with the military, was behind the attack. It mentions the military's cooperation with Washington after the latter's failure in taking over Sumatra, an area which at that time contained strong support for Marxism and therefore constituted a threat for the Western bloc, particularly the US. Over time, the military and the PKI became increasingly at-odds. In August 1965, the military feared that because of the Fifth Regiment (Angkatan Kelima), they would not able to monopolise the military - and as a result, the PKI would be unstoppable. This led to impatience within the military for the fall of Sukarno.

British psyops
The role of the Foreign Office and MI6 intelligence service of United Kingdom, then Indonesia's colonial neighbor on the island of Borneo, has also come to light, in a series of exposés by Paul Lashmar and James Oliver in The Independent newspaper in December 1998, as well as their book, Britain's Secret Propaganda War.

The revelations included an anonymous Foreign Office source stating that the decision to unseat President Sukarno was made by Prime Minister Harold Macmillan then executed under Prime Minister Harold Wilson. According to the exposés, the United Kingdom had already become alarmed with the announcement of the Konfrontasi policy. It has been claimed that a CIA memorandum of 1962 indicated that Prime Minister Macmillan and President John F. Kennedy were increasingly alarmed by the possibility of the confrontation with Malaysia spreading, and agreed to "liquidate President Sukarno, depending on the situation and available opportunities." However, the documentary evidence does not support this claim.

To weaken the regime, the Foreign Office's Information Research Department (IRD) coordinated psychological operations in concert with the British military, to spread black propaganda casting the Communist Party of Indonesia (PKI), Chinese Indonesians, and Sukarno in a bad light. These efforts were to duplicate the successes of British Psyop campaign in the Malayan Emergency.

Of note, these efforts were coordinated from the British High Commission in Singapore where the British Broadcasting Corporation (BBC), Associated Press (AP), and The New York Times filed their reports on the Indonesian turmoil. According to Roland Challis, the BBC correspondent who was in Singapore at the time, journalists were open to manipulation by IRD because of Sukarno's stubborn refusal to allow them into the country: "In a curious way, by keeping correspondents out of the country Sukarno made them the victims of official channels, because almost the only information you could get was from the British ambassador in Jakarta."

These manipulations included the BBC reporting that communists were planning to slaughter the citizens of Jakarta. The accusation was based solely on a forgery planted by Norman Reddaway, a propaganda expert with the IRD. He later bragged in a letter to the British ambassador in Jakarta, Sir Andrew Gilchrist that it "went all over the world and back again," and was "put almost instantly back into Indonesia via the BBC." Gilchrist himself informed the Foreign Office on 5 October 1965: "I have never concealed from you my belief that a little shooting in Indonesia would be an essential preliminary to effective change."

In April 2000, Sir Denis Healey, Secretary of State for Defence at the time of the war, confirmed to The Independent that the IRD was active during this time. He officially denied any role by MI6, and denied "personal knowledge" of the British arming the right-wing faction of the Army, though he did comment that if there were such a plan, he "would certainly have supported it."

Although MI6 is strongly implicated in this scheme by the use of the Information Research Department (seen as an MI6 office), any role by MI6 itself is officially denied by the UK government, and papers relating to it had yet to be declassified by the Cabinet Office. (The Independent, 6 December 2000)

Upon declassification, the documents were used to contend that the British had supported the slaughter and that this was done in three ways: encouragement of the killing; giving the Indonesian military a free hand by furnishing assurances that there would be no British intervention while PKI was being crushed; and propaganda operations.

In October 2021, further light was shed on the United Kingdom's role when declassified documents revealed that the government had covertly deployed black propaganda in order to urge prominent Indonesians to "cut out [the] communist cancer". As the atrocities began in October 1965, British spooks called for "the PKI and all communist organisations [to] be eliminated". The nation, they warned, would be in danger "as long as the communist leaders are at large and their rank and file are allowed to go unpunished".

Series of inconsistencies
Historian John Roosa highlights several inconsistencies in the official version of the events. Roosa primarily bases his theories on the candid reflection of Supardjo. As a general who joined the movement just days before its execution, Supardjo offers a unique perspective on the movement as both an outsider and insider. In his testimony intended for the PKI leadership, he assesses the strengths and weaknesses of the 30 September Movement, particularly those of its presumed leader, Kamaruzaman Sjam.

Roosa then challenges the credibility of the evidence on which the Suharto regime based its official narrative. The evidence provided by the army consisted of the testimony of two officers who were under the influence of torture and therefore unreliable.

Hence, Roosa indicates that the army does not provide conclusive evidence of the PKI being the mastermind behind the movement.

Similarly, he asks why, if the movement was planned by military officers, as alleged in the Cornell Paper, was it so poorly planned. Despite the movement being labeled a "coup attempt", the movement's troops did not execute the plan with military efficiency or planning. As Roosa notes, the movement's military force, which only consisted of 2,130 total military personnel and 2,000 civilians, was spread too thin to constitute a single operational force, especially compared to the number of military troops stationed in the city(footnote). Also, the lack of tanks proves that the forces did not have the intention of taking government control. The forces of Aidit and his men were separated from the rest of the movement's forces under Untung and the other men by a total distance of two miles, under two separate strategic headquarters. Furthermore, the two forces did not have efficient means of communication between them; the movement itself shut down the city's telephone system when it took over the telecommunications building, and neither group had walkie-talkies or other radio devices to relay plans back and forth. Instead, several of the leaders used shuttles and couriers as a means of communication. Roosa contributes these inconsistencies in planning to Sjam, noting his lack of experience in military strategy. In any case, he says, the movement's leaders as a group were too disparate to find enough common ground to carry out the operation.

Throughout the coup attempt, the PKI utilized the broadcast system a total of four times, greatly limiting their presentation of the movement to the public. Each broadcast was also inconsistent and clashing.

The first statement reported the movement's capture of the generals and their intent to act against the sympathizers of the Council of Generals. After five hours, the PKI released its second statement revealing the names of the deputy commanders under Lieutenant Colonel Untung. The third broadcast, "Decision No. 1", listed the 45 members of the Indonesian Revolution Council. The fourth broadcast then declared Untung as the highest-ranking official and any higher member was to be demoted.

Roosa argues that the broadcasts provided an inconsistent face to the public; and thus, they obtained little public support. The broadcasts were self-contradictory, as they oscillated between protecting Sukarno and disposing of him due to his unwillingness to support the movement. In the end, the broadcasts were ineffective and provided no assistance to the coup.

As to the movement itself, Roosa concludes that it was led by Sjam, in collaboration with Aidit, but 'not' the PKI as a whole, together with Pono, Untung and Latief. Suharto was able to defeat the movement because he knew of it beforehand and because the Army had already prepared for such a contingency. He says Sjam was the link between the PKI members and the Army officers, but lack of coordination was a major reason for the failure of the movement.

Footnotes

References

Primary sources

 The appendices of Roosa (2006) contain translations of two primary sources: a 1966 document by Supardjo and the 1967 court testimony of Kamaruzaman Sjam. Roosa also lists interviews he conducted which are archived at the Institute of Indonesian Social History in Jakarta.

Secondary sources

 
 
 
  
 
 Fic, Victor M. (2005). Anatomy of the Jakarta Coup: 1 October 1965: The Collusion with China which destroyed the Army Command, President Sukarno and the Communist Party of Indonesia. Jakarta: Yayasan Obor Indonesia. 

 Hughes, John (2002), The End of Sukarno – A Coup that Misfired: A Purge that Ran Wild, Archipelago Press, 
 Lashmar, Paul and Oliver, James. "MI6 Spread Lies To Put Killer in Power", The Independent. (16 April 2000)
 Lashmar, Paul and Oliver, James. "How we destroyed Sukarno", The Independent. (6 December 2000)
 
 Nugroho Notosusanto & Ismail Saleh (1968) The Coup Attempt of the "30 September Movement" in Indonesia, P.T. Pembimbing Masa-Djakarta.
 Rafadi, Dedi & Latuconsina, Hudaya (1997) Pelajaran Sejarah untuk SMU Kelas 3 (History for 3rd Grade High School), Erlangga Jakarta. 
 Ricklefs, M.C. (1982) A History of Modern Indonesia, MacMillan. 
 
 
 
 Sekretariat Negara Republik Indonesia (1975) 30 Tahun Indonesia Merdeka: Jilid 3 (1965–1973) (30 Years of Indonesian Independence: Volume 3 (1965–1973))
 Sekretariat Negara Republik Indonesia (1994) Gerakan 30 September Pemberontakan Partai Komunis Indonesia: Latar Belakang, Aksi dan Penumpasannya (The 30 September Movement/Communist Party of Indonesia: Bankgrounds, Actions and its Annihilation) 

 Sundhaussen, Ulf (1982) The Road to Power: Indonesian Military Politics 1945–1967, Oxford University Press. 
 Wertheim, W.F. (1970) Suharto and the Untung Coup – the Missing Link, Journal of Contemporary Asia I No. 1 pp 50–57

External links

United States Department of State documents on U.S. Foreign Relations, 1964–1968: Indonesia
Coup and Counter Reaction, October 1965 – March 1966: Documents 142–205

Transition to the New Order
Attempted coups in Indonesia
Cold War conflicts
1965 in Indonesia
Information Research Department
Murder in Jakarta